Dumuzid, titled the Fisherman, was a legendary Sumerian king of Uruk listed originating from Kuara. According to legend, in the one-hundredth year of his reign, he was captured by Enmebaragesi.

Sumerian King List 

The primary source of information comes from the Sumerian King List:

Dumuzid, the fisherman, whose city was Kuara, ruled for 100 years.He (Dumuzid) was taken captive by the (single hand of Enmebaragesi).

According to scholars, the sequence of the first Uruk dynasty was fabricated during the Ur III period, which didn't include comments about some rulers. The fabrication of king Dumuzid could have been derived from an ideological representation of the positional relationship, thought to have been practiced by the Ur III kings and their predecessors to Dumuzid in the myth of the holy wedding, and was added as a symbol of this act.

To be able to distinguish him from the god Dumuzid, the profession of fisherman and the origin from Kuara were assigned to him, probably from a cult in Kuara, where there is evidence of a temple of Dumuzid. The C version of the Sumerian King List contains the ending of his reign in hands of Enmebaragesi, this addition has been interpreted as a subsequent addition, which would give historical weight and justify the lack of expansion in the literary texts.

The Tale of Gudam 
The Tale of Gudam  is known from a single, one column tablet inscribed with 37 lines. The composition starts with the preparation of a festival for Inanna, in which Gudam participates, although his role remains doubtful. Gudam decides to ravage the city of Uruk, but is defeated by the little fisherman of Inanna.

It has been suggested that the "little fisherman of Inanna" was a corruption from the original reading of "the fisherman Dumuzi(d), the fisherman of Inanna(k)".

See also

 Sumerian King List
History of Sumer
 Uruk

Notes

References

Citations

Bibliography
 
Mittermayer, C. (2009) Enmerkara und der Herr von Arata: Ein ungleicher Wettstreit. OBO 239. Fribourg: Academic Press / Göttingen: Vandenhoeck & Ruprecht.
Bendt, Alster; Feldt, Laura (2004). "Gudam and the Bull of Heaven". Nederlands Instituut voor het Nabije Oosten. Assyria and Beyond. Studies Presented to Mogens Trolle Larsen.
 Marchesi, Gianni (2004). "Who Was Buried in the Royal Tombs of Ur? The Epigraphic and Textual Data". Orientalia NOVA SERIES.

Kings of Uruk
Sumerian kings
Fishers